The Outriders is a 1950 American Western film directed by Roy Rowland and starring Joel McCrea.

Plot 
With the Civil War nearing an end, rebel soldiers Will Owen, Jesse Wallace, and Clint Priest escape from a Union stockade in Missouri. A bandit leader and Confederate sympathizer, Keeley, recruits them to join a wagon train run by Don Chaves that is carrying a million dollars' worth of gold bullion.

The men see it as a chance to help the South and also profit. Don Chaves is suspicious of them, but permits them to be outriders, accompanying the wagon train but staying 200 yards from the others. Apaches attack and the three men help fend them off, gaining the Don's trust.

The beautiful widow Jen Gort attracts the interest of Will and Jesse, who have a falling-out. She is escorting teenaged Roy, her young brother-in-law, who is eager to prove his courage to the older men by fighting Indians by their side. The boy ends up inadvertently causing a stampede, however, then drowns while attempting to cross a raging river.

News comes that the war is over. Because of that, plus his love for Jen and admiration for the Don, the robbery no longer interests Will, but Jesse is determined to go through with it so that he and Keeley can split the money. A gunfight ends in Jesse's death; Will and Jen can go on with their lives.

Cast
 Joel McCrea as Will Owen
 Arlene Dahl as Jen Gort
 Barry Sullivan as Jesse Wallace
 Claude Jarman, Jr. as Roy Gort
 James Whitmore as Clint Priest
 Ramon Novarro as Don Antonio Chaves
 Jeff Corey as Keeley
 Ted de Corsia as Bye
 Martin Garralaga as Father Damasco

Production
Parts of the film were shot in Duck Creek, Aspen Mirror Lake, Strawberry Valley, Paria, Long Valley, and Asay Creek in Utah.

Reception
According to MGM records the movie earned $1,540,000 in the US and Canada and $639,000 elsewhere, making a loss to the studio of $497,000.

Dennis Schwartz  gave the film a positive review and found the film "a well-acted conventional Western directed in a workmanlike way by Roy Rowland".

See also
 List of American films of 1950

References

External links
The Outriders at TCMDB

1950 films
1950 Western (genre) films
1950s English-language films
American Western (genre) films
Films scored by André Previn
Films shot in Utah
Metro-Goldwyn-Mayer films
1950s American films